811 Naval Air Squadron was a unit of the British Royal Navy's Fleet Air Arm. It was first founded in 1933, and served during World War II, seeing action in the battle of the Atlantic and on Russian convoys, and was eventually disbanded in 1956.

Service history

Pre-war
The squadron was formed on 3 April 1933 by amalgamating No. 465 and No. 466 Fleet Torpedo Flights, and served aboard the aircraft carrier  in the Home Fleet. Initially equipped with the Blackburn Ripon Mk.II, these were replaced in January 1935 with the Blackburn Baffin, which were in turn replaced by the Fairey Swordfish Mk.I in October 1936. In December 1938 the Furious was paid off, and the next year 811 Squadron was assigned to her sister ship . The squadron lost much of its personnel and all of its aircraft when Courageous was sunk by a U-boat on 17 September 1939, and the survivors of 811 and 812 squadrons were reformed into 815 Naval Air Squadron.

World War II
811 Squadron was reformed in July 1941 at RNAS Lee-on-Solent (HMS Daedalus), near Portsmouth, as a torpedo-bomber reconnaissance squadron, and was equipped with two Sea Hurricanes and fourteen American Vought SB2U Vindicators, which the British called the "Chesapeake". The squadron also received two former civilian Avro 652s (the precursor to the Avro Anson) which they operated until March 1942. The Chesapeake's were part of an order originally placed by the French Navy in March 1940, but after the fall of France the order was taken over by the British. The aircraft were fitted with an additional fuel tank and armour, and the single French 7.5 mm Darne machine gun was replaced by four British machine guns. It was intended that they be used as anti-submarine patrol aircraft operating from the escort carrier , but it was soon realised that the Chesapeake lacked the power to fly from such a small vessel while carrying a useful load, and they were reassigned to training squadrons in November 1941, and the squadron received Swordfish Mk.2's as replacements.

From August to December 1942 811 Squadron was based at RAF Bircham Newton in Norfolk, serving under the control of RAF Coastal Command, and flying on anti-shipping and mine-laying operations. In January 1943, the squadron received three Grumman F4F Wildcat Mk.IVs, called the "Martlet" in British service, and on 21 February 1943 flew from RNAS Hatston to embark aboard the escort carrier  to serve on convoy escort duty in the battle of the Atlantic. On 25 April a Swordfish from 811 Squadron attacked , which was then sunk by depth charges by Pathfinder. The convoy arrived at Halifax, Nova Scotia, on 5 April without loss.

From 2 May Biter defended the convoys HX 237 and SC 129 from German wolf packs. On 12 May a Swordfish from 811 Squadron, with the destroyer  and the frigate , attacked and sank . After arriving at Liverpool, the squadron disembarked and were stationed at RNAS Machrihanish (HMS Landrail).

On 2 June 811 Squadron returned to Biter to escort further convoys between Liverpool and Halifax, including ON-207 in October. While at Naval Station Argentia in November, the squadron was supplied with the new American acoustic torpedo, codenamed the Mark 24 mine, but commonly known as "FIDO". On 17 November a Swordfish smashed into the end of the flight deck of Biter while landing in a heavy swell, and its unused FIDO torpedo fell into the sea and exploded, badly damaging Biters rudder. The carrier managed to return to Rosyth Dockyard for repairs, which took a month.

While Biter was under repair 811 Squadron were stationed at RNAS Inskip (HMS Nightjar), finally returning to the ship on 12 January 1944. In early February Biter sailed in support of Convoy ONS-29 to Halifax, then transferred to Convoy OS-68/KMS-42 bound for Freetown and Gibraltar. On 16 February, in the Bay of Biscay, 811's Martlets shot down a Ju 290 long-range reconnaissance aircraft, which had attempted to attack the convoy escorts with a glide bomb. Biter arrived at Gibraltar on 25 February where two Swordfish of 811 Squadron spent a week operating out of RAF North Front. On 2 March Biter sailed again, escorting the UK-bound convoys SL-150 and MKS-41, and arrived at Liverpool on the 13th. Biter continued to escort convoys between the UK and Gibraltar until August 1944 when she was withdrawn from service, for conversion to a transport carrier.

811 Squadron was temporarily based at RAF Limavady in Northern Ireland, serving under RAF Coastal Command, until joining  in September 1944 to escort convoys to Russia. 811 Squadron was disbanded on its return in December 1944.

Post war
The squadron was reformed in September 1945, and in August 1946 was equipped with the Sea Mosquito TR.33, which was a de Havilland Mosquito FB.VI modified for carrier operations. An early prototype, flown by test pilot Eric Brown, was the first twin-engined aircraft to make a carrier landing, when it touched down aboard  on 25 March 1944. Stationed at RNAS Brawdy, Pembrokeshire, 811 Squadron was the only unit to operate this type, which never served aboard a carrier, before it was superseded by the Sea Hornet. The squadron was disbanded in July 1947.

811 Squadron was reformed in the 1950s, with the Hawker Sea Fury, and embarked aboard HMS Warrior dispatched to the Far East for the Korean War. The squadron flew patrols there until the Peace Treaty was signed in 1954.

References

 

800 series Fleet Air Arm squadrons